NEDD8 ultimate buster 1 is a protein that in humans is encoded by the NUB1 gene.

Function 

NUB1 interacts with and negatively regulates NEDD8 (MIM 603171), a ubiquitin-like protein that covalently conjugates to cullin (see MIM 603134) family members.[supplied by OMIM]

Interactions 

NUB1 has been shown to interact with NEDD8, UBD and AIPL1.

References

Further reading